Mangelia indistincta is a species of sea snail, a marine gastropod mollusk in the family Mangeliidae.

Description
Monterosato based his Pleurotoma indistincta on the Mangilia caerulans as described by Appelius in 1869.

Distribution
This species occurs in the Mediterranean Sea off Southern Italy and Corsica, France..

References

 Monterosato T. A. (di), 1875 (letta il 24. 1. 1875)a : Nuova rivista delle Conchiglie Mediterranee. (Catalogo delle Conchiglie Mediterranee) Atti dell'Accademia Palermitana di Scienze, Lettere ed Arti, Palermo (2) 5: 1–50
 Gofas, S.; Le Renard, J.; Bouchet, P. (2001). Mollusca, in: Costello, M.J. et al. (Ed.) (2001). European register of marine species: a check-list of the marine species in Europe and a bibliography of guides to their identification. Collection Patrimoines Naturels, 50: pp. 180–213

External links
  Tucker, J.K. 2004 Catalog of recent and fossil turrids (Mollusca: Gastropoda). Zootaxa 682:1–1295.

indistincta
Gastropods described in 1875